Katarina Tomašević (née Stevancevic; born 6 February 1984) is a Serbian handballer for the Serbian national team.

Honors
Austrian Championship:
Winner: 2007
Serbian Championship:
Winner: 2011, 2012
German Championship:
Winner: 2013
Hungarian Championship:
Winner: 2015

Personal life
Tomašević is married. She gave birth to her son Petar in July 2011, and her daughter Jovana was born in January 2017.

References

External links

1984 births
Living people
Serbian female handball players
Handball players from Belgrade
Expatriate handball players
Serbian expatriate sportspeople in Austria
Serbian expatriate sportspeople in Denmark
Serbian expatriate sportspeople in France
Serbian expatriate sportspeople in Germany
Serbian expatriate sportspeople in Hungary
Serbian expatriate sportspeople in Spain
Ferencvárosi TC players (women's handball)